Murrumujuk is an outer rural locality of Darwin. It is on the coast of Shoal Bay, south of Gunn Point. The area has been provisionally set aside for a residential subdivision. Murrumujuk is of aboriginal origin.

References

External links

Suburbs of Darwin, Northern Territory